Una donna per amico is an Italian television series, which ran on Rai 1 for three seasons from September 27, 1998 to April 16, 2001. The series revolves around a group of doctors and nurses in the department of Gynecology and Obstetrics of a Roman hospital.

Plot 
Laura Andrei and Piero La Torre, both gynecologists in a hospital in Rome, have been married for years and have two children, Francesca and Dado. The couple begins to go through a period of crisis following the appointment of Laura to primary aid at the expense of Piero, who, frustrated and neglected by his wife, weaves an affair with Rita Lanceri Kraus, a pharmaceutical rep who has already had a relationship with Piero's dearest friend, the anesthesiologist Stefano Morandi.

In the department of Gynecology and Obstetrics where Piero and Laura work there are other doctors and nurses, always under the watchful eyes of primary Luigi Conti: there are Sister Mary, an African midwife, the nurses Debora, Gina, Anna, and Caterina, the pediatrician and neonatologist Luca Liberati, the trainees Paoletta Malindri and Sandro Tonini, the primary aid Gianclaudio Russo, and the fellow Paride.

Series overview

External links 
  
 

1998 Italian television series debuts
2001 Italian television series endings
Serial drama television series
Italian medical television series
1990s Italian drama television series
2000s Italian drama television series
RAI original programming